The City of Croydon was a local government area about  east of Melbourne, the state capital of Victoria, Australia.

History

Croydon was originally part of the Shire of Lillydale, which was incorporated as a district on 19 September 1856, and as a shire in 1872. Croydon itself became the centre of a severance movement, and was incorporated as a shire on 24 May 1961. After much local debate, it was proclaimed as a city on 22 May 1971.

On 15 December 1994, the City of Croydon was abolished, and along with the City of Ringwood, was merged into the newly created City of Maroondah.

Council meetings were held at the Municipal Offices on Civic Drive, off Mount Dandenong Road, Croydon. It presently serves as a service centre and library for the City of Maroondah.

Wards

The City of Croydon was subdivided into three wards, each electing three councillors:
 North Ward
 Centre Ward
 South Ward

Suburbs
 Bayswater (shared with the City of Knox)
 Bayswater North
 Croydon*
 Croydon Hills
 Croydon North
 Croydon South
 Kilsyth (shared with the Shire of Lillydale)
 Warranwood

* Council seat.

Population

* Estimate in the 1958 Victorian Year Book.

References

External links
 Victorian Places - Croydon and Croydon City

Croydon
City of Maroondah
1961 establishments in Australia
1994 disestablishments in Australia